Hackelia sharsmithii is a species of flowering plant in the borage family known by the common name Sharsmith's stickseed. It is native to the Sierra Nevada of California, where its range extends along ridges surrounding the intersection of Inyo County and Fresno and Tulare Counties, including Mount Whitney. It is a plant of rocky habitat, such as talus. It is a hairy perennial herb up to about 30 centimeters tall. Most of the leaves are located around the base of the plant, reaching up to 14 centimeters long. Leaves higher on the stem are shorter and narrower. The hairy inflorescence is an open array of branches, each a coiling panicle of light blue flowers. The fruit is a cluster of nutlets, sometimes bearing prickles.

References

External links
Jepson Manual Treatment
Photo gallery

sharsmithii
Flora of California